The Spruce Street Singers was a gay men's chorus in Philadelphia, Pennsylvania.  Co-founded by Stephen Ng in 1985, they had several directors, including Jonathan Palant (2001-2002).  Their farewell concert was on November 19, 2005 at the Ethical Society of Philadelphia.

At least two other groups were created through the Spruce Street Singers - "Men On Tap," an LGBT tap dancing ensemble, and "Philadelphia Voices of Pride," an LGBT choral ensemble.

References

Choirs in Pennsylvania
Musical groups established in 1985
Musical groups from Philadelphia
Gay men's choruses
Choral societies
LGBT culture in Philadelphia
1985 establishments in Pennsylvania